The Heinkel HE 1 (aka Caspar S 1) was a two-seat, low-wing monoplane floatplane, designed in 1921 by German designer Ernst Heinkel at Caspar-Werke.

The HE 1  was produced under licence in Sweden for the Marinen (Swedish Navy) in 1921 as the Svenska S.2. The HE 1 was powered by a  Maybach Mb.IVa engine; one test aircraft was powered by a Siddeley Puma engine.

Specifications

Operators

Swedish Navy
Swedish Air Force

References

 

Low-wing aircraft
1920s German military reconnaissance aircraft
1920s Swedish military aircraft
HE 001
Floatplanes
Svenska Aero aircraft
Single-engined tractor aircraft
Aircraft first flown in 1923